Rhododendron goodenoughii is a rhododendron species native to Papua New Guinea, particularly Goodenough Island where it grows at altitudes of . The flowers are trumpet-shaped, white, and fragrant.

This species does not tolerate freezing temperatures, so must be grown with protection in temperate zones.

References

 Reinwardtia 1960. 5: 131.
 The Plant List
 Encyclopedia of Life
 Hirsutum.com
 Vireya.net
 National Center for Biotechnology Information, U.S. National Library of Medicine
 Stanton Eversole, "Rhododendron goodenoughii", Journal American Rhododendron Society, Volume 39, Number 4, Fall 1985.

goodenoughii